Iwatesan may refer to: 

 Mount Iwate (Iwate-san), a volcano in Iwate Prefecture, Japan
 Asteroid 11109 Iwatesan, named after the mountain